Sergio Munoz Jr. is an American attorney and Democratic member of the Texas House of Representatives, serving since 2011. Munoz also owns and operates the Munoz Law Firm.

References

External links
Biography at Ballotpedia
Legislative page

Living people
Democratic Party members of the Texas House of Representatives
Hispanic and Latino American state legislators in Texas
University of Texas at Austin alumni
Thurgood Marshall School of Law alumni
People from Mission, Texas
1982 births
21st-century American politicians